The Codex Claromontanus V, designated by h in traditional system or by 12 in the Beuron system, is a 4th or 5th century Latin manuscript of the New Testament. The text, written on vellum.

Description
The manuscript contains the text of the four Gospels with lacunae in Matthew 1:1-3:15; 14:44-18:12 on 66 parchment leaves. It contains the Ammonian Sections and Eusebian Canons, it uses abbreviations.

Text

The text of the codex represents Old Latin textual tradition in the Gospel of Matthew. In rest of Gospels it has text of Vulgate.

The nomina sacra are written in an abbreviated way.

History
The manuscript was bought by Pius VI (1775-1798).

The text of the codex was edited by Paul Sabatier, Angelo Mai, Johannes Belsheim, and Jülicher.

Location
The codex is located, in the Vatican Library (Lat. 7223) at Vatican.

See also

 List of New Testament Latin manuscripts

References

Further reading 
 Johannes Belsheim, Evangelium secundum Matthaeum,  Christiania 1892.
 F. C. Burkitt, On Codex Claromontanus (h), (JTS, London 1903), pp. 587–588.

External links 

 Images of Claromontanus V

Vetus Latina New Testament manuscripts
5th-century biblical manuscripts
Vulgate manuscripts